Return from Mecca is the title of the reunion 3rd album from Hip Hop group X Clan, released on January 30, 2007. This is the group's first studio album in 15 years since 1992's Xodus.  A music video was made of the single "Weapon X."

Contributors
X Clan originally consisted of four members, Brother J, Professor X, Sugar Shaft and Paradise the Architect. Sugar Shaft died in 1995 because of complications from AIDS, and Professor X died in early 2006 because of complications from spinal meningitis, leaving only two of the original members. Return From Mecca features guest appearances from Damian Marley, Chali 2na of Jurassic 5, KRS-One, Kottonmouth Kings, RBX, Abstract Rude, and Jacoby Shaddix of Papa Roach. Featured producers include DJ Quik, DJ Khalil, and Jake One.

Track listing
"X Clan Album Intro" (Produced by DJ Fat Jack)
"Aragorn" (Produced by Quazedelic)
"Voodoo" featuring RBX & Quazedelic (Produced by DJ Khalil)
"Hovercraft"
"Why You Doin' That" (Produced by Bean One)
"Weapon X" (Produced by Ultraman)
"Speak the Truth" featuring KRS-One (Produced by Jake One)
"Positrons" (Produced by Quazedelic)
"Mecca" featuring Jah Orah (Produced by Quazedelic)
"Prison" featuring Christian Scott (Produced by Proh Mic)
"Atonement" featuring Jah Orah (Produced by DJ Fat Jack)
"Brother, Brother" featuring DJ Quik (Produced by DJ Quik)
"Funky 4 You" featuring Chali 2na (Produced by Quazedelic)
"Self Destruct" (Produced by J Thrill)
"Space People" featuring Quazedelic (Produced by Quazedelic)
"Trump Card" featuring Hannah Barbera (Produced by ACL, DJ Fat Jack & P-Nice)
"To the East" featuring YZ & Abstract Rude (Produced by DJ Fat Jack)
"Locomotion" featuring Daddy X, Tri State and Kottonmouth Kings(Produced by Proh Mic)
"Americans" featuring Jacoby Shaddix (Produced by Patrick P-Nice Shevelin)
"3rd Eyes On Me" featuring Tri State (Produced by DJ Khalil)
"Culture United" featuring Damian Marley
"Respect" [Hidden track] featuring Tech N9ne

References

2007 albums
X Clan albums
Suburban Noize Records albums
Albums produced by DJ Khalil
Albums produced by DJ Quik
Albums produced by Jake One
Political music albums by American artists